An ouverture is an introductory movement to a larger musical work.

Ouverture, Ouvertüre, l'Ouverture, Louverture, or variation, may also refer to:

People
 Toussaint Louverture (1743–1803), leader of the Haitian Revolution
 Suzanne Simone Baptiste Louverture (1742–1816), wife of Toussaint l'Ouverture
 Moyse Louveture (1733–1801; also called Moïse Hyacinthe L’Ouverture), Haitian Revolution military commander
 Donaldson Toussaint L'Ouverture Byrd II (1932–2013), U.S. jazz musician

Places
 L'Ouverture International Airport, Port-au-Prince, Haiti
 Toussaint L'Ouverture County Cemetery, Franklin, Williamson County, Tennessee, USA
 L'Ouverture Hospital, Franklin and Armfield Office, Alexandra, Virginia, USA

Arts and entertainment
 "Ouverture" (song), a 2003 song by Daft Punk off the album Daft Club
 "Ouverture" (song), a 2008 track by Within Temptation off Black Symphony
 Rozen Maiden: Ouvertüre, a Japanese anime cartoon TV show

Other uses
 Louverture Films

See also

 
 
 
 Overture (disambiguation)
 Toussaint Louverture (disambiguation)